The Kazakhs (also spelled Qazaqs; Kazakh:  , , ,  ,) are  a Turkic people native to Central Asia and Eastern Europe, mainly Kazakhstan, but also parts of northern Uzbekistan and the border regions of Russia, as well as northwestern China (specifically Ili Kazakh Autonomous Prefecture) and western Mongolia (Bayan-Ölgii Province). The Kazakhs are descendants of the ancient Turkic Kipchak tribes and the medieval Mongolic tribes, and generally classified as Turco-Mongol cultural group.

Kazakh identity is of medieval origin and was strongly shaped by the foundation of the Kazakh Khanate between 1456 and 1465, when following disintegration of the Golden Horde, several tribes under the rule of the sultans Janibek and Kerei departed from the Khanate of Abu'l-Khayr Khan in hopes of forming a powerful khanate of their own.

Kazakh is used to refer to ethnic Kazakhs, while the term Kazakhstani usually refers to all inhabitants or citizens of Kazakhstan, regardless of ethnicity.

Etymology 
The Kazakhs likely began using that name during the 15th century. There are many theories on the origin of the word Kazakh or Qazaq. Some speculate that it comes from the Turkic verb  ("wanderer, brigand, vagabond, warrior, free, independent") or that it derives from the Proto-Turkic word  (a wheeled cart used by the Kazakhs to transport their yurts and belongings).

Another theory on the origin of the word Kazakh (originally ) is that it comes from the ancient Turkic word , first mentioned on the 8th century Turkic monument of Uyuk-Turan. According to Turkic linguist Vasily Radlov and Orientalist Veniamin Yudin, the noun  derives from the same root as the verb  ("to obtain", "to gain"). Therefore,  defines a type of person who wanders and seeks gain.

History 
Throughout history, Kazakhstan has been home to many nomadic societies of the Eurasian Steppe, including the Sakas (Scythian-related), the Xiongnu, the Western Turkic Khaganate, the Mongol Empire, the Golden Horde and the Kazakh Khanate, which was established in 1465.

Kazakh was a common term throughout medieval Central Asia, generally with regard to individuals or groups who had taken or achieved independence from a figure of authority. Timur described his own youth without direct authority as his  ("freedom", "Qazaq-ness").

In Turko-Persian sources, the term Özbek-Qazaq first appeared during the middle of the 16th century, in the Tarikh-i-Rashidi by Mirza Muhammad Haidar Dughlat, a Chagatayid prince of Kashmir. In this manuscript, the author locates Kazakh in the eastern part of Desht-i Qipchaq. According to Tarikh-i-Rashidi, the first Kazakh union was created  1465/1466 AD. The state was formed by nomads who settled along the border of Moghulistan, and was called Uzbeg-Kazák.

At the time of the Uzbek conquest of Central Asia, Abu'l-Khayr Khan, a descendant of Shiban, had disagreements with the Kazakh sultans Kerei and Janibek, descendants of Urus Khan. These disagreements probably resulted from the crushing defeat of Abu'l-Khayr Khan at the hands of the Kalmyks. Kerei and Janibek moved with a large following of nomads to the region of Zhetysu on the border of Moghulistan and set up new pastures there with the blessing of the Chagatayid khan of Moghulistan, Esen Buqa II, who hoped for a buffer zone of protection against the expansion of the Oirats.

Regarding these events, Haidar Dughlat in his Tarikh-i-Rashidi reports:

In the 17th century, Russian convention seeking to distinguish the Qazaqs of the steppes from the Cossacks of the Imperial Russian Army suggested spelling the final consonant with "kh" instead of "q" or "k", which was officially adopted by the USSR in 1936.
 Kazakh - 
 Cossack -  

The Ukrainian term Cossack probably comes from the same Kipchak etymological root, meaning wanderer, brigand, or independent free-booter.

Oral history 
Like many people who live a nomadic lifestyle, Kazakhs keep an epic tradition of oral history which goes back centuries. It is most commonly relayed in the form of song (kyi) and poetry (zhyr), which typically tell the stories of Kazakh national heroes.

The Kazakh oral tradition has long been used for propagandistic purposes. The highly influential Kazakh poet Abai Qunanbaiuly viewed it as the ideal way to transmit the pro-Westernization ideals of his colleages. The Kazakh oral tradition has also overlapped with ethnic nationalism, and has been appropriated for decolonialist educational purposes since the collapse of the Soviet Union.

Three Kazakh Juz (Hordes) 

In modern Kazakhstan, tribalism is fading away in business and government life. However, it is still common for Kazakhs to ask each other about the tribe they belong to when they become acquainted with one another. Now, it is more of a tradition than a necessity, and there is no hostility between tribes. Kazakhs, regardless of their tribal origin, consider themselves one nation.

Those modern-day Kazakhs who yet remember their tribes know that their tribes belong to one of the three Zhuz (juz, roughly translatable as "horde" or "hundred"):
 The Senior Horde (also called Elder or Great) (Uly juz)
 The Middle (also called Central) (Orta juz)
 The Junior (also called Younger or Lesser) (Kishi juz)

History of the Hordes 
There is much debate surrounding the origins of the Hordes. Their age is unknown so far in extant historical texts, with the earliest mentions in the 17th century. The Turkologist Velyaminov-Zernov believed that it was the capture of the important cities of Tashkent, Yasi, and Sayram in 1598 by Tevvekel (Tauekel/Tavakkul) Khan that separated the Qazaqs, as they possessed the cities for only part of the 17th century. The theory suggests that the Qazaqs then divided among a wider territory after expanding from Zhetysu into most of the Dasht-i Qipchaq, with a focus on the trade available through the cities of the middle Syr Darya, to which Sayram and Yasi belonged. The Junior juz originated from the Nogais of the Nogai Horde.

Language 

The Kazakh language is a member of the Turkic language family, as are Uzbek, Kyrgyz, Tatar, Uyghur, Turkmen, modern Turkish, Azeri and many other living and historical languages spoken in Eastern Europe, Central Asia, Xinjiang, and Siberia.

Kazakh belongs to the Kipchak (Northwestern) group of the Turkic language family.

Kazakh, like most of the Turkic language family lacks phonemic vowel length, and as such there is no distinction between long and short vowels.

Kazakh was written with the Arabic script until the mid-19th century, when a number of educated Kazakh poets from Muslim madrasahs incited a revolt against Russia. Russia's response was to set up secular schools and devise a way of writing Kazakh with the Cyrillic alphabet, which was not widely accepted. By 1917, the Arabic script for Kazakh was reintroduced, even in schools and local government.

In 1927, a Kazakh nationalist movement sprang up against the Soviet Union but was soon suppressed. As a result, the Arabic script for writing Kazakh was banned and the Latin alphabet was imposed as a new writing system. In an effort to Russianize the Kazakhs, the Latin alphabet was in turn replaced by the Cyrillic alphabet in 1940 by Soviet interventionists. Today, there are efforts to return to the Latin script.

Kazakh is a state (official) language in Kazakhstan. It is also spoken in the Ili region of the Xinjiang Uyghur Autonomous Region in the People's Republic of China, where the Arabic script is used, and in western parts of Mongolia (Bayan-Ölgii and Khovd province), where Cyrillic script is in use. European Kazakhs use the Latin alphabet.

Religion 
In the late 14th century, the Golden Horde propagated Islam in its state. Islam in Kazakhstan peaked during the era of the Kazakh Khanate, especially under rulers such as Ablai Khan and Kasym Khan. Another wave of conversions among the Kazakhs occurred during the 15th and 16th centuries via the efforts of Sufi orders. During the 18th century, Russian influence toward the region rapidly increased throughout Central Asia. Led by Catherine, the Russians initially demonstrated a willingness in allowing Islam to flourish as Muslim clerics were invited into the region to preach to the Kazakhs, whom the Russians viewed as "savages" and "ignorant" of morals and ethics. However, Russian policy gradually changed toward weakening Islam by introducing pre-Islamic elements of collective consciousness. Such attempts included methods of eulogizing pre-Islamic historical figures and imposing a sense of inferiority by sending Kazakhs to highly elite Russian military institutions. In response, Kazakh religious leaders attempted to bring in pan-Turkism, though many were persecuted as a result. During the Soviet era, Muslim institutions survived only in areas that Kazakhs significantly outnumbered non-Muslims, such as non-indigenous Russians, by everyday Muslim practices. In an attempt to conform Kazakhs into Communist ideologies, gender relations and other aspects of Kazakh culture were key targets of social change.

In more recent times, however, Kazakhs have gradually employed a determined effort in revitalizing Islamic religious institutions after the fall of the Soviet Union. Most Kazakhs continue to identify with their Islamic faith, and even more devotedly in the countryside. Those who claim descent from the original Muslim soldiers and missionaries of the 8th-century command substantial respect in their communities. Kazakh political figures have also stressed the need to sponsor Islamic awareness. For example, the Kazakh Foreign Affairs Minister, Marat Tazhin, recently emphasized that Kazakhstan attaches importance to the use of "positive potential Islam, learning of its history, culture and heritage."

Pre-Islamic beliefs, such as worship of the sky, the ancestors, and fire, continued to a great extent to be preserved among the common people, however. Kazakhs believed in the supernatural forces of good and evil spirits, of wood goblins and giants. To protect themselves from them and from the evil eye, Kazakhs wore protection beads and talismans. Shamanic beliefs are still widely preserved among Kazakhs, as well as the belief in the strength of the bearers of that worship, the shamans, which Kazakhs call bakhsy. Unlike the Siberian shamans, who used drums during their rituals, Kazakh shamans, who could also be men or women, played (with a bow) on a stringed instrument similar to a large violin. At present both Islamic and pre-Islamic beliefs continue to be found among Kazakhs, especially among the elderly. According to 2009 national census 39,172  ethnic Kazakhs are Christians (0.0038% of all Kazakhstani Kazakhs).

Origin and ethnogenesis 
Kazakhs are a Turkic-speaking ethnic group, who formed from various nomadic tribes and clans, sharing a common lifestyle. The region, once inhabited by Indo-European, specifically Iranian peoples such as the Saka, Turkic peoples largely assimilated and replaced the previous population, giving rise to various Stepper entities, such as the First Turkic Khaganate or the Kipchak Khaganate, which was later conquered by Mongolic peoples and integrated into the Mongol empire. Subsequently, the ancestors of Kazakhs belonged to the Golden Horde, a Turco-Mongol state, which would later disintegrate and give rise to the Kazakh Khanate, in which the final ethnogenesis of Kazakhs took place. There was also some secondary Han Chinese influence through the Tang dynasty in Inner Asia, with the Turkic tribes being vassals of Tang China, declaring the Chinese emperor to be the Heavenly Khaghan of Turks.

The exact place of origins of the Turkic peoples has been a topic of much discussion. Their homeland may have been in Southern Siberia, specifically the Altai-Sayan region. Early and medieval Turkic groups exhibited a wide range of both East Asian and West-Eurasian physical appearances and genetic origins, in part through long-term contact with neighboring peoples such as Iranian, Mongolic, Tocharian, Yeniseian people, and others.

The Kazakhs emerged as an ethno-linguistic group during the early 15th century from a confederation of several, mostly Turkic-speaking pastoral nomadic groups of Northern Central Asia. The Kazakhs are the most northerly of the Central Asian peoples, inhabiting a large expanse of territory in northern Central Asia and southern Siberia known as the Kazakh Steppe. The tribal groups formed a powerful confederation that grew wealthy on the trade passing through the steppe lands along the fabled Silk Road.

Genetic studies 

Genomic research confirmed that Kazakhs originated from the admixture of several tribes. Kazakhs have predominantly East Asian ancestry, and harbor two East Asian-derived components, one dominant component commonly found among Northeastern Asian populations (associated with the Northeast Asian "Devil’s Gate_N" sample from the Amur region), and another minor component associated with historical Yellow River farmers, peaking among Han Chinese. According to one study, West-Eurasian related admixture among Kazakhs is estimated at 35% to 37.5% in two Kazakh populations. Another study estimated a lower average Western admixture of slightly less than 30%. These results are inline with historical demographic information on northern Central Asia. Neighboring Karakalpaks, Kyrgyz, Tubalar, and the Xinjiang Ölöd tribe, have the strongest resemblance to the Kazakh genome.

A study on allele frequency and genetic polymorphism by Katsuyama et al., found that Kazakhs cluster together with Japanese people, Hui people, Han Chinese, and Uyghurs in contrast to West-Eurasian reference groups.

A 2020 genetic study on the Kazakh genome, by Seidualy et al., found that the Kazakh people formed from highly mixed historical Central Asian populations. Ethnic Kazakhs were modeled to derive about ~63.2% ancestry from an East Asian-related population, specifically from a Northeast Asian source sample (Devil’s Gate 1), ~30.8% ancestry from European-related populations (presumably from Scythians), and ~6% ancestry from a broadly South Asian population. Overall, Kazakhs show their closest genetic affinity with other Central Asian populations, namely, Kalmyk, Karakalpak and Kyrgyz people, but also Mongolians. MSMC analyses suggest that the main ancestral lineage of Kazakhs split from Mongolians and other Northeast Asians about 7,000 years ago, while their divergence from Koryaks was estimated to be 10,000 years ago.

Maternal lineages 
According to mitochondrial DNA studies (where sample consisted of only 246 individuals), the main maternal lineages of Kazakhs are: D (17.9%), C (16%), G (16%), A (3.25%), F (2.44%) of East-Eurasian origin (55%), and haplogroups H (14.1), T (5.5), J (3.6%), K (2.6%), U5 (3%), and others (12.2%) of West-Eurasian origin (41%). An analysis of ancient Kazakhs found that East Asian haplogroups such as A and C did not begin to move into the Kazakh steppe region until around the time of the Xiongnu (1st millennia BCE), which is around the onset of the Sargat Culture as well .

Gokcumen et al. (2008) tested the mtDNA of a total of 237 Kazakhs from Altai Republic and found that they belonged to the following haplogroups: D(xD5) (15.6%), C (10.5%), F1 (6.8%), B4 (5.1%), G2a (4.6%), A (4.2%), B5 (4.2%), M(xC, Z, M8a, D, G, M7, M9a, M13) (3.0%), D5 (2.1%), G2(xG2a) (2.1%), G4 (1.7%), N9a (1.7%), G(xG2, G4) (0.8%), M7 (0.8%), M13 (0.8%), Y1 (0.8%), Z (0.4%), M8a (0.4%), M9a (0.4%), and F2 (0.4%) for a total of 66.7% mtDNA of Eastern Eurasian origin or affinity and H (10.5%), U(xU1, U3, U4, U5) (3.4%), J (3.0%), N1a (3.0%), R(xB4, B5, F1, F2, T, J, U, HV) (3.0%), I (2.1%), U5 (2.1%), T (1.7%), U4 (1.3%), U1 (0.8%), K (0.8%), N1b (0.4%), W (0.4%), U3 (0.4%), and HV (0.4%) for a total of 33.3% mtDNA of West-Eurasian origin or affinity. Comparing their samples of Kazakhs from Altai Republic with samples of Kazakhs from Kazakhstan and Kazakhs from Xinjiang, the authors have noted that "haplogroups A, B, C, D, F1, G2a, H, and M were present in all of them, suggesting that these lineages represent the common maternal gene pool from which these different Kazakh populations emerged."

In every sample of Kazakhs, D (predominantly northern East Asian, such as Japanese, Okinawan, Korean, Manchu, Mongol, Han Chinese, Tibetan, etc., but also having several branches among indigenous peoples of the Americas) is the most frequently observed haplogroup (with nearly all of those Kazakhs belonging to the D4 subclade), and the second-most frequent haplogroup is either H (predominantly European) or C (predominantly indigenous Siberian, though some branches are present in the Americas, East Asia, and eastern and northern Europe).

Paternal lineages 

In a sample of 54 Kazakhs and 119 Altaian Kazakh, the main paternal lineages of Kazakhs are: C (66.7% and 59.5%), O (9% and 26%), N (2% and 0%), J (4% and 0%), R (9% and 1%) respectively.

Population 

Historical population of Kazakhs:
Huge drop in population of Ethnic Kazakhs between 1897 and 1959 years caused by colonial politics of Russian Empire, then genocide 
which occurred during Stalin Regime. Sarah Cameron (Associate Professor of University of Maryland) described this genocide on her book, "The Hungry Steppe: Famine, Violence, and the Making of Soviet Kazakhstan".

Kazakh minorities

Russia 

In Russia, the Kazakh population lives primarily in the regions bordering Kazakhstan. According to latest census (2002) there are 654,000 Kazakhs in Russia, most of whom are in the Astrakhan, Volgograd, Saratov, Samara, Orenburg, Chelyabinsk, Kurgan, Tyumen, Omsk, Novosibirsk, Altai Krai and Altai Republic regions. Though ethnically Kazakh, after the dissolution of the Soviet Union in 1991, those people acquired Russian citizenship.

China 

Kazakhs migrated into Dzungaria in the 18th century after the Dzungar genocide resulted in the native Buddhist Dzungar Oirat population being massacred.

Kazakhs, called "" in Chinese are among 56 ethnic groups officially recognized by the People's Republic of China. According to the census data of 2010, Kazakhs had a population of 1.462 million, ranking 17th among all ethnic groups in China. Thousands of Kazakhs fled to China during the 1932–1933 famine in Kazakhstan.

In 1936, after Sheng Shicai expelled 30,000 Kazakhs from Xinjiang to Qinghai, Hui led by General Ma Bufang massacred their fellow Muslim Kazakhs, until there were 135 of them left.

From Northern Xinjiang over 7,000 Kazakhs fled to the Tibetan-Qinghai plateau region via Gansu and were wreaking massive havoc so Ma Bufang solved the problem by relegating Kazakhs to designated pastureland in Qinghai, but Hui, Tibetans, and Kazakhs in the region continued to clash against each other. Tibetans attacked and fought against the Kazakhs as they entered Tibet via Gansu and Qinghai. In northern Tibet, Kazakhs clashed with Tibetan soldiers, and the Kazakhs were sent to Ladakh.

In 1934, 1935, and from 1936 to 1938 Qumil Elisqan led approximately 18,000 Kerey Kazakhs to migrate to Gansu, entering Gansu and Qinghai.

In China there is one Kazakh autonomous prefecture, the Ili Kazakh Autonomous Prefecture in the Xinjiang Uyghur Autonomous Region and three Kazakh autonomous counties: Aksai Kazakh Autonomous County in Gansu, Barkol Kazakh Autonomous County and Mori Kazakh Autonomous County in the Xinjiang Uyghur Autonomous Region.

At least one million Uyghurs, Kazakhs and other ethnic Muslims in Xinjiang have been detained in mass detention camps, termed "reeducation camps", aimed at changing the political thinking of detainees, their identities, and their religious beliefs.

Mongolia 

In the 19th century, the advance of the Russian Empire troops pushed Kazakhs to neighboring countries. In around 1860, part of the Middle Jüz Kazakhs came to Mongolia and were allowed to settle down in Bayan-Ölgii, Western Mongolia and for most of the 20th century they remained an isolated, tightly knit community.
Ethnic Kazakhs (so-called Altaic Kazakhs or Altai-Kazakhs) live predominantly in Western Mongolia in Bayan-Ölgii Province (88.7% of the total population) and Khovd Province (11.5% of the total population, living primarily in Khovd city, Khovd sum and Buyant sum). In addition, a number of Kazakh communities can be found in various cities and towns spread throughout the country. Some of the major population centers with a significant Kazakh presence include Ulaanbaatar 90% in khoroo #4 of Nalaikh düüreg, Töv and Selenge provinces, Erdenet, Darkhan, Bulgan, Sharyngol (17.1% of population total) and Berkh cities.

Uzbekistan 
As of the beginning of 2021, more than 821000 ethnic Kazakhs lived in Uzbekistan.

Iran 
During the Qajar period, Iran bought Kazakh slaves who were falsely masqueraded as Kalmyks by slave dealers from the Khiva and Turkmens.

Kazakhs of the Aday tribe inhabited the border regions of the Russian Empire with Iran since the 18th century.  The Kazakhs made up 20% of the population of the Trans-Caspian region according to the 1897 census.  As a result of the Kazakhs' rebellion against the Russian Empire in 1870, a significant number of Kazakhs became refugees in Iran.

Iranian Kazakhs live mainly in Golestan Province in northern Iran. According to ethnologue.org, in 1982 there were 3000 Kazakhs living in the city of Gorgan. Since the fall of the Soviet Union, the number of Kazakhs in Iran decreased because of emigration to their historical motherland.

Afghanistan 
Kazakhs fled to Afghanistan in the 1930s escaping Bolshevik persecution. Kazakh historian Gulnar Mendikulova cites that there were between 20,000 and 24,000 Kazakhs in Afghanistan as of 1978. Some assimilated locally and cannot speak the Kazakh language.

As of 2021, there are about 200 Kazakhs remaining in Afghanistan according to Kazakhstan's foreign ministry. Locals claim that many live in Kunduz and others in Takhar Province, Baghlan Province, Mazar-i-Sharif and Kabul.

Afghan Kypchaks are Aimak (Taymani) tribe of Kazakh origin that can be found in Obe District to the east of the western Afghan province of Herat, between the rivers Farāh Rud and Hari Rud. There are approximately 440,000 Afghan Kipchaks.

Turkey 
Turkey received refugees from among the Pakistan-based Kazakhs, Turkmen, Kirghiz, and Uzbeks numbering 3,800 originally from Afghanistan during the Soviet–Afghan War. Kayseri, Van, Amasya, Çiçekdağ, Gaziantep, Tokat, Urfa, and Serinyol received via Adana the Pakistan-based Kazakh, Turkmen, Kirghiz, and Uzbek refugees numbering 3,800 with UNHCR assistance.

In 1954 and 1969 Kazakhs migrated into Anatolia's Salihli, Develi and Altay regions. Turkey became home to refugee Kazakhs.

The Kazakh Turks Foundation (Kazak Türkleri Vakfı) is an organization of Kazakhs in Turkey.

Culture

Music 
One of the most commonly used traditional musical instruments of the Kazakhs is the dombra, a plucked lute with two strings. It is often used to accompany solo or group singing. Another popular instrument is kobyz, a bow instrument played on the knees. Along with other instruments, both instruments play a key role in the traditional Kazakh orchestra. A notable composer is Kurmangazy, who lived in the 19th century. After studying in Moscow, Gaziza Zhubanova became the first woman classical composer in Kazakhstan, whose compositions reflect Kazakh history and folklore. A notable singer of the Soviet epoch is Roza Rymbaeva, she was a star of the trans-Soviet-Union scale. A notable Kazakh rock band is Urker, performing in the genre of ethno-rock, which synthesises rock music with the traditional Kazakh music.

Notable Kazakhs

See also 
 Chala Kazakh
 Kazakh Americans
 Kazakh Canadians
 Kazakhs in Russia
 Turkic peoples
 List of Kazakhs
 Ethnic demography of Kazakhstan

References

External links 

 Kazakh tribes
 ‘Contemporary Falconry in Altai-Kazakh in Western Mongolia’The International Journal of Intangible Heritage (vol.7), pp. 103–111. 2012. 
 ‘Ethnoarhchaeology of Horse-Riding Falconry’, The Asian Conference on the Social Sciences 2012 – Official Conference Proceedings, pp. 167–182. 2012. 
 ‘Intangible Cultural Heritage of Arts and Knowledge for Coexisting with Golden Eagles: Ethnographic Studies in “Horseback Eagle-Hunting” of Altai-Kazakh Falconers’, The International Congress of Humanities and Social Sciences Research, pp. 307–316. 2012. 
 ‘Ethnographic Study of Altaic Kazakh Falconers’, Falco: The Newsletter of the Middle East Falcon Research Group 41, pp. 10–14. 2013. 
 ‘Ethnoarchaeology of Ancient Falconry in East Asia’, The Asian Conference on Cultural Studies 2013 – Official Conference Proceedings, pp. 81–95. 2013. 
 Soma, Takuya. 2014. 'Current Situation and Issues of Transhumant Animal Herding in Sagsai County, Bayan Ulgii Province, Western Mongolia', E-journal GEO 9(1): pp. 102–119. 
 Soma, Takuya. 2015. Human and Raptor Interactions in the Context of a Nomadic Society: Anthropological and Ethno-Ornithological Studies of Altaic Kazakh Falconry and its Cultural Sustainability in Western Mongolia. University of Kassel Press, Kassel (Germany) .

Ethnic groups in Russia
Ethnic groups in Kazakhstan
Ethnic groups in Kyrgyzstan
Ethnic groups in Mongolia
Ethnic groups in Tajikistan
Ethnic groups in Turkmenistan
Ethnic groups in Uzbekistan
Muslim communities of Russia
 
Turkic peoples of Asia
Ethnic groups in Iran
Modern nomads
Pastoralists
Nomadic groups in Eurasia